Natya is a locality in Victoria, Australia, located approximately 61 km from Swan Hill, Victoria.

Natya Post Office opened on 28 April 1920 and closed in 1973.

References

Towns in Victoria (Australia)
Rural City of Swan Hill
Populated places on the Murray River